The Doctors' Trial (officially United States of America v. Karl Brandt, et al.) was the first of 12 trials for war crimes of high-ranking German officials and industrialists that the United States authorities held in their occupation zone in Nuremberg, Germany, after the end of World War II. These trials were held before US military courts, not before the International Military Tribunal, but took place in the same rooms at the Palace of Justice. The trials are collectively known as the "subsequent Nuremberg trials", formally the "Trials of War Criminals before the Nuremberg Military Tribunals" (NMT).

Twenty of the twenty-three defendants were medical doctors and were accused of having been involved in Nazi human experimentation and mass murder under the guise of euthanasia. The indictment was filed on 25 October 1946; the trial lasted from 9 December that year until 20 August 1947. Of the 23 defendants, seven were acquitted and seven received death sentences; the remainder received prison sentences ranging from 10 years to life imprisonment.

Background
Twenty of the twenty-three defendants were medical doctors (Viktor Brack, Rudolf Brandt, and Wolfram Sievers were Nazi officials), and were accused of having been involved in Nazi human experimentation and mass murder under the guise of euthanasia. Josef Mengele, one of the leading Nazi doctors, had evaded capture.

The judges, heard before Military Tribunal I, were Walter B. Beals (presiding judge) from Washington, Harold L. Sebring from Florida, and Johnson T. Crawford from Oklahoma, with Victor C. Swearingen, a former special assistant to the Attorney General of the United States, as an alternate judge. The Chief of Counsel for the Prosecution was Telford Taylor and the chief prosecutor was James M. McHaney.

Indictment 
The accused faced four charges, including:

 Conspiracy to commit war crimes and crimes against humanity as described in counts 2 and 3;
 War crimes: performing medical experiments, without the subjects' consent, on prisoners of war and civilians of occupied countries, in the course of which experiments the defendants committed murders, brutalities, cruelties, tortures, atrocities, and other inhuman acts. Also planning and performing the mass murder of prisoners of war and civilians of occupied countries, stigmatized as aged, insane, incurably ill, deformed, and so on, by gas, lethal injections, and diverse other means in nursing homes, hospitals, and asylums during the Euthanasia Program and participating in the mass murder of concentration camp inmates.
 Crimes against humanity: committing crimes described under count 2 also on German nationals.
 Membership in a criminal organization, the SS.

The tribunal largely dropped count 1, stating that the charge was beyond its jurisdiction.

I — Indicted   G — Indicted and found guilty

All of the criminals sentenced to death were hanged on 2 June 1948 at Landsberg Prison.

For some, the difference between receiving a prison term and the death sentence was membership in the SS, "an organization declared criminal by the judgement of the International Military Tribunal". However, some SS medical personnel received prison sentences. The degree of personal involvement and/or presiding over groups involved was a factor in others.

See also

 Command responsibility
 Declaration of Geneva
 Declaration of Helsinki
 Medical ethics
 Medical torture
 Nazi eugenics
 Nuremberg Code
 Nuremberg principles
 Nuremberg trials
 Bruno Beger
 Hans Conrad Julius Reiter
 Claus Schilling
 Hermann Stieve
 List of medical ethics cases

References

Further reading

External links

  – Partial transcript from the trial
 
 

Nazi human subject research

Nazi eugenics
Holocaust trials
United States Nuremberg Military Tribunals
1947 in case law
1947 in Germany